Monika Juodeskaite (born 3 October 1991) is a middle-distance and long-distance runner. While attending the Oklahoma State University, Monika was a two-time All-American runner and three-time NCAA Division 1 All-Midwest Region cross country.

NCAA
Monika Juodeskaite earned ten All-Big 12 conference honors for Oklahoma State University. She was an All-American in 2013 Cross Country and 2014 Outdoor 5,000 Meters Outdoor Track and field.

International
Monika qualified to represent Lithuania. She competed in Athletics at the 2015 Summer Universiade – Women's 5000 metres where she placed 14th in 16:24.42. She competed in 2013 European Athletics U23 Championships – Women's 5000 metres where she placed 10th in 16:22.46 (8th after disqualifications).

Professional
Monika Juodeskaite qualified for 2016 Summer Olympic Standard in the Marathon. Her time in 2015 Chicago Marathon was 2:34.29.

References

External links
 Oklahoma State University Monika Juodeskaite profile
 Monika Juodeskaite on Facebook
 Monika Juodeskaite on Instagram
 IAAF Monika Juodeskaite profile
 Monika Juodeskaite Athletic profile
 World University Games Monika Juodeskaite profile
 European Monika Juodeskaite profile

1991 births
Living people
Lithuanian female middle-distance runners
Lithuanian female long-distance runners
Oklahoma State Cowgirls track and field athletes